World War 3 Illustrated is an American comics anthology magazine with a left-wing political focus, founded in 1979 (though the first issue was published in 1980) by New York City comic book artists Peter Kuper and Seth Tobocman, and painter Christof Kohlhofer, and subsequently produced by a collective with a rotating editorship. 

Other frequent contributors, mostly based in New York City, include Isabella Bannerman, Sue Coe, Scott Cunningham, Eric Drooker, Sandy Jimenez, Sabrina Jones, Mac McGill, Kevin Pyle, and James Romberger.

A predominantly black-and-white printed comic book story anthology, World War 3 Illustrated has featured full-color covers and occasional special color sections “within book.”

Overview 
Typical World War 3 Illustrated issues are focused on a single political issue, theme or broad subject, decided upon by the editorial staff. Artists and writers are then invited to develop material addressing the issue's subject. This approach of incubating material around a different political concern or specific topic every issue has made the magazine an extremely diverse and unpredictable periodical anthology in the world of comics, and possibly the longest-running of its kind in print, at over 30 years of publication.

Unlike other comic book anthology-format magazines like Heavy Metal, Mad, or the defunct Epic Illustrated, World War 3 Illustrated is known less for character-based episodic features and more for the sustained or recurring presence of certain artists. The exception is Sandy Jimenez's "Shit House Poet", running exclusively in World War 3 Illustrated since 1991, making it the magazine's longest-running recurring feature with an identifiable single cast of characters. 2011 marked the feature's 21st year in the magazine.

Publication history
The magazine initially began as a home for comic book work and graphic/illustrated storytelling that was anti-establishment and aggressively critical of the social and political right-wing conservatism in ascension after the election of President Ronald Reagan. In the spirit of the then-burgeoning DIY approach prevalent among independent punk and hardcore bands and musicians, the magazine took control of the means of production and distribution, foregoing possible relationships with established publishing institutions or companies for the sake of its own editorial integrity and political independence.

In the first decade of the magazine, its focus ranged from the global to the hyper-local, specifically addressing the politics and concerns affecting the neighborhoods of the Lower East Side of Manhattan: housing rights; gentrification; police brutality; racism; economic oppression. The 1988 Tompkins Square Park riot was a watershed event for the magazine's founders and artistic contributors, as much of the work in the anthology had focused squarely on the political issues leading to the riot, such as the city government's policies towards squatters and the homeless. When tensions brought the riot to its most dangerous points across the two-day conflict, much of the notable imagery associated with the grassroots resistance on improvised signage and wheat-pasted posters was appropriated from published work in the magazine created by Eric Drooker, Seth Tobocman, and others.

The late 1980s and 1990s saw an increasing diversity in both the number of new individual artists and writers contributing original comic book stories to World War 3 Illustrated, and a widening of the range in subject matter. The magazine has published a number of special issues on women/feminism, including Herstories (1992) Female Complaints (1999), Bitchcraft (2000), and Shameless Feminists (2021).

Issue #39, Wordless Words, was a 120-page collection of wordless comics released in January 2009.

In 2010–2011, New York's Exit Art gallery exhibited "Graphic Radicals", work from World War 3 Illustrated curated by Kuper, Tobocman, and Susan Willmarth celebrating the magazine's 30th anniversary.

In 2014, the magazine celebrated its 35th anniversary.

Issue #49, published in 2017, was titled Now Is the Time of Monsters and focused on predatory capitalism.

Issue #50, Shameless Feminists, published in 2019, featured contributions from Sabrina Jones, Trina Robbins, Lauren Weinstein, Monica McKelvey Johnson, and Sandy Jimenez, among others.

In 2020 the magazine published a 220-page special issue titled "The World We Are Fighting For."

World War 3 Illustrated has historically carried advertising of fewer than ten pages total per issue, and has ranged in total page-count from 80 pages to 138 in recent issues of the last decade.

Distribution 
The 1990s was also by an explosive expansion in the magazine's distribution, as Ruth Schwartz of Mordam Records took on the magazine's circulation fulfillment, ensuring that it would be present in any and all outlets that already carried the notable music punk ‘zine Maximum Rocknroll. This distribution agreement took World War 3 Illustrated's issues international, as they were carried by Tower Records in all territories. The partnership with Mordam Records continued late into the 1990s, until World War 3 Illustrated handed its distribution over to Chris Staros of Top Shelf Productions and Diamond Comic Distributors. In 2017, AK Press took over publication of the magazine.

Aesthetics, logo
The magazine's look is greatly informed by the work of its original founders, and also the era and context in which the anthology was initially developed: the 1980s DIY culture and grassroots activism. Much of the earlier work was created for the magazine with an eye toward visuals that could be easily reproduced in other media, such as silk-screened banners, posters, and T-shirts.

In the past decade, the magazine has increasingly published work that is more varied in its graphic approach, with increasing use of halftones, grayscaling, and fine linework alongside, the established hardline work and photocollage of years past.

The magazine's logo, an image of a globe superimposed over a blazing matchstick, is indicative of the magazine's philosophy concerning the need for vigilance and recognition of perennial conflicts and systems of ongoing oppression all over the world.

Contributors and controversy
Other contributors to World War 3 Illustrated include Peter Bagge, Fly, Spain Rodriguez, Art Spiegelman, Chuck Sperry, and Tom Tomorrow. Imprisoned activists and writers like Mumia Abu-Jamal and embattled cartoonist Mike Diana have published work in the magazine.

Collections
 World War 3 Illustrated 1980-1988. (1989). Fantagraphics Books. 
 World War 3 Illustrated: Confrontational Comics. (1995). Four Walls Eight Windows. 
 World War 3 Illustrated: 1979–2014. (2014). PM Press.

References

Notes

Sources 
  (World War 3 Illustrated)
  (AK Press)
  — reviewing work that appeared in the Exit Art show "Reactions" which featured original work by World War 3 Illustrated artists

External links
 

1980 comics debuts
Comics magazines published in the United States
Comics about politics
Fantagraphics titles
Top Shelf Productions titles